Samei is a Loloish language of Yunnan, China closely related to Sani (Bradley 2005). It is spoken in 47 villages in and around Ala Township 阿拉彝族乡, just southeast of downtown Kunming, as well as in 7 villages in western Yiliang County (Ethnologue). There are about 20,000 speakers out of an estimated 28,000 ethnic population. Samei lexical data is also documented in Satterthwaite-Phillips (2011).

Further reading

References

Satterthwaite-Phillips, Damian. 2011. Phylogenetic inference of the Tibeto-Burman languages or On the usefulness of lexicostatistics (and "Megalo"-comparison) for the subgrouping of Tibeto-Burman. Ph.D. dissertation, Stanford University.

Loloish languages
Languages of China